The trigeminal tubercle, or tuberculum cinereum is a raised area between the rootlets of the accessory nerve and posterolateral sulcus. It overlies the spinal tract of the trigeminal nerve.
It is an elevation in the lower part of medulla, lateral to the cuneate fasciculus, produced by a mass of grey matter called the spinal trigeminal nucleus.

References

Neuroanatomy